Üzümlü District is a district of Erzincan Province in Turkey. The municipality of Üzümlü is the seat and the district had a population of 13,928 in 2021.

The district was established in 1987.

Composition 
Beside the seat of Üzümlü, the district encompasses the municipality of Altınbaşak, twenty-three villages and 57 hamlets.

Villages 

 Avcılar
 Bağlar
 Balabanlı
 Bayırbağ
 Bulanık
 Büyükköy
 Çadırtepe
 Çamlıca
 Çardaklı
 Çayıryazı
 Demirpınar
 Denizdamı
 Derebük
 Esenyurt
 Göller
 Karacalar
 Karakaya
 Kureyşlisarıkaya
 Ocakbaşı
 Otluk
 Pelitli
 Pınarlıkaya
 Pişkidağ

References 

Districts of Erzincan Province